Events during the year 1945 in Northern Ireland.

Incumbents 
 Governor - The Duke of Abercorn (until 7 September), Earl Granville (from 7 September)
 Prime Minister - Basil Brooke

Events 
 27 February – Aircraft carrier  is launched at the Harland and Wolff shipyard in Belfast to British Admiralty order as HMS Powerful.
 8 May – V-E Day is celebrated throughout the UK.
 14 May – Formal surrender of German U-boats at Londonderry Port (HMS Ferret, Lisahally). As part of Operation Deadlight many are scuttled offshore.
 16 May – Éamon de Valera replies in a radio broadcast to Winston Churchill's criticism of Irish neutrality.
 26 July – 1945 United Kingdom general election.
 15 August- V-J Day is celebrated in the UK.
 21 August – Two Nationalist Members of Parliament, Eddie McAteer and Malachy Conlon, take the Oath of Allegiance and enter the Parliament of the United Kingdom at Westminster.
 15 October – Professor Eoin MacNeill dies in Dublin aged 77. He was a founder-member of the Gaelic League and the Irish Volunteers.
 14 November – A convention meeting in Dungannon establishes the nationalist Irish Anti-Partition League.

Arts and literature 
 John Luke paints The Old Callan Bridge and The Three Dancers.
 F. L. Green's novel Odd Man Out is published.

Sport

Football 
 Irish League
Winners: Linfield

 Irish Cup
Winners: Linfield 4 – 2 Glentoran

Births 
 29 January – Jim Nicholson, Unionist politician and MEP for Northern Ireland.
 12 June – Pat Jennings, international soccer player.
 4 July – David McWilliams, singer, songwriter and guitarist (died 2002).
 18 July – Pat Doherty, politician
 16 August – Allan Bresland, DUP Northern Ireland Assembly member for West Tyrone.
 25 August – Sammy Duddy, member of the Ulster Political Research Group (died 2007).
 31 August – Van Morrison, singer and songwriter.
 15 September – Dave Clements, soccer player and manager.
 21 September – Shaw Clifton, General of The Salvation Army.
 17 October – Jimmy Cricket (James Mulgrew), comedian.
 31 October – Bobbie Hanvey, photographer and radio personality.
 17 November – Damien Magee, racing driver.
 5 December – Evin Crowley, actress.

Full date unknown 
 Brendan Hamill, poet and writer.
 Martin Meehan, Sinn Féin politician, previously volunteer in the Provisional Irish Republican Army (died 2007).
 Ernie Rea, religious broadcaster.
 Graham Reid, playwright.
 James A. Sharkey, historian and Irish diplomat.

Deaths 
 13 October – Joseph MacRory, Cardinal, Archbishop of Armagh and Primate of All Ireland (born 1861).
 15 October – Eoin MacNeill, scholar, nationalist and revolutionary (born 1867).
 20 December – John M. Lyle, architect in Canada (born 1872).

See also 
 1945 in Scotland
 1945 in Wales

References